Palhawas is a village in Rewari Tehsil, in the Rewari District of Haryana, India. It is on Rewari-Jhajjar road, approximately  distance from Rewari. Palhawas railway station is on Rewari-Rohtak railway line.

Demographics
As of 2011 India census, Palhawas, Rewari had a population of 4463 in 890 households. Males (2301) constitute 51.55%  of the population and females (2162) 48.45%. Palhawas has an average literacy (3800) rate of 85%, higher than the national average of 74%: male literacy (2000) is 86%, and female literacy (1800) is 83% of total literates (3800). In Palhawas, Rewari, 13.08% of the population is under 6 years of age (584).

Adjacent villages
 Rohrai
 Kulana
 Gurawra

References 

Villages in Rewari district
Year of establishment missing